Roaring Fork is an unincorporated community and coal town located in Wise County, Virginia, United States.

References

Unincorporated communities in Wise County, Virginia
Unincorporated communities in Virginia
Coal towns in Virginia